The 2000 International Formula 3000 season was the thirty-fourth season of the second-tier of Formula One feeder championship and also sixteenth season under the International Formula 3000 Championship moniker. It featured the 2000 FIA Formula 3000 International Championship which was contested over ten rounds from 8 April to 26 August 2000. Bruno Junqueira won the Drivers’ Championship and D2 Playlife Super Nova won the Teams’ title.

For 2000, the FIA imposed an upper limit of 15 teams of 2 cars each, with one of the places reserved for the winning team of the 1999 Italian Formula 3000 Championship; therefore, 7 bottom-ranked teams of 1999 would not have been eligible to advance to the next year. Portman-Arrows team collapsed midway through the 1999 championship, and 6 formerly competing teams were initially excluded from the 2000 championship.

In between the seasons, RSM Marko managed to buy the Oreca's slot (at the same time adopting the name Red Bull Junior Team), Arden merged with Draco, and Coloni bought the slot from Team Martello, the winners of the Italian championship; therefore, only Monaco Motorsport, GP Racing and Durango were left behind. Additionally, West Competition was renamed to mySap.com, and the second Super Nova squad (former Den Blå Avis) continued to operate under the name of Petrobras Junior Team.

As the FIA was changing the operational structure of Formula 3000 for the latter to be more of a proper seeder and supporting series for Formula One, a few F3000 teams announced their collaboration with Formula One teams. European Formula was confirmed as a junior team for Arrows instead of the de-funct Portman team, Team Astromega announced partnership with Minardi, and Super Nova announced two partnerships: with Benetton, as D2 Super Nova, and with Williams, as Petrobras Junior Team (former Den Blå Avis). Additionally, mySap.com was officially recognized as the McLaren junior team, Red Bull Junior Team retained the status of a junior team for Sauber, and Apomatox continued to run under Prost as Gauloises Formula. Although Arden's Darren Manning spent the full year as a BAR test driver, the BAR team opted not to work with Arden, and Ferrari, Jordan, and Jaguar also did not maintain active partnerships with any of the Formula 3000 teams.

Drivers and teams 

The following drivers and teams contested the 2000 FIA Formula 3000 International Championship.

All cars were Lola B99/50s powered by Zytek V8 engines.

Calendar

Final points standings

Teams

Drivers' championship

Notes
All drivers used Lola B99/50 chassis, with Zytek V8 engines, and Avon tyres.
Andreas Scheld was disqualified from second place at the European round (Nürburgring) for using an illegal front wing.

References

Formula 3000
International Formula 3000 seasons
Formula 3000